Nord Anglia International School Manila (or "NAIS Manila" pronounced 'Nace') is an English National Curriculum international school located in the Philippines. The school is in Manila Bay within the Aseana Business Park in Parañaque, serving both local and expatriate communities in and around Metro Manila.It offers IGCSE examinations from Grade 10 - 11. The school collaborates with Juilliard School to provide music, drama, and dance classes to students.

Administration
The school is owned & governed by the Nord Anglia Education.

Student body
The school was opened in August 2012 with a capacity for 500 students.

References

British international schools in the Philippines
International schools in Metro Manila
Schools in Parañaque
Educational institutions established in 2012
2012 establishments in the Philippines